Elections to Welwyn Hatfield Borough Council took place on 5 May 2022. This was on the same day as other local elections across the United Kingdom.

Results summary

Ward results

Brookmans Park and Little Heath

Haldens

Handside

Hatfield Central

Hatfield East

Hatfield South West

Hatfield Villages

Hollybush

Howlands

Northaw and Cuffley

Panshanger

Peartree

Sherrads

Welham Green and Hatfield South

Welwyn East

Welwyn West

References

Welwyn Hatfield Borough Council elections
Welwyn